Sol Airlines can refer to the following:

Sol Air, later renamed AeroHonduras, a now defunct airline from Honduras.
Sol Dominicana Airlines, a start-up airline from the Dominican Republic.
Sol Líneas Aéreas, a regional airline from Argentina